Leonhard Haskel (7 April 1872 – 30 December 1923) was a German stage and film actor and drama teacher.

Haskel was born in Seelow, in the Prussian Province of Brandenburg, and died in Berlin.

Selected filmography
 Europe, General Delivery (1918)
 One or the Other (1919)
 The Boy in Blue (1919)
 The Secret of the American Docks (1919)
 The Gambler (1919)
 Judith Trachtenberg (1920)
 Hearts are Trumps (1920)
 Catherine the Great (1920)
 The Girl from Acker Street (1920)
 Playing with Fire (1921)
 The Black Panther (1921)
 Wandering Souls (1921)
 Four Around a Woman (1921)
 The Story of a Maid (1921)
 Impostor (1921)
 Marizza (1922)
 The Love Story of Cesare Ubaldi (1922)
 The Big Shot (1922)
 Prashna's Secret (1922)
 The Flight into Marriage (1922)
 Bigamy (1922)
 Barmaid (1922)
 Lola Montez, the King's Dancer (1922)
 The Street (1923)
 The Lost Shoe (1923)
 The Chain Clinks (1923)
 The Hungarian Princess (1923)
 La Boheme (1923)
 Explosion (1923)
 Resurrection (1923)
 Leap Into Life (1924)
 The Four Marriages of Matthias Merenus (1924)
 The Game of Love (1924)

Bibliography
 Jung, Uli & Schatzberg, Walter. Beyond Caligari: The Films of Robert Wiene. Berghahn Books, 1999.

External links

1872 births
1923 deaths
People from Seelow
People from the Province of Brandenburg
German male film actors
German male stage actors
German male silent film actors
20th-century German male actors